Night Watch is a 1992 novel by Icelandic author Fríða Á. Sigurðardóttir. It won the Nordic Council's Literature Prize in 1992.

References

1992 novels
Icelandic novels
Icelandic-language novels
Nordic Council's Literature Prize-winning works